Gopi – Goda Meeda Pilli is a 2006 Indian Telugu-language comedy film directed by Janardhana Maharshi. It stars Allari Naresh, Jagapathi Babu, Aarti Chabria, Gowri Munjal in lead roles with music composed by Koti. The film is recorded as a Super Hit at the box office.

Plot 
The film begins at Vaikunta where Lord Vishnu and Goddess Lakshmi are avidly observing a fickle human. Gopi is a bachelor who rejects hundreds of matches as they fail to meet his expectations, and his parents are fed-up with it. Once, his bestie Balaraju requests to accompany him as he is going to fix his espousal where Gopi falls for Lakshmi the bride. So, he artifices to get Balaraju to turn down the proposal and engages himself by playing on Lakshmi. Just a day before the wedding, Gopi acquires a fine job in Bangalore and he proceeds. Soon after his arrival, his new boss offers his daughter’s hand to him when fitful Gopi accepts it. However, he gets a jerk after viewing his fatty daughter. Immediately, he not only changes his mind but also tricks to make the situation in his favour. 

Parallelly, serious bomb detonates are conducted in Bangalore by a terrorist organization headed by Abbu Gulam. A special officer Balavinder Cheda in charge of the operation of capturing the terrorist. As it is inevitable Gopi takes the road to be on time. On the way, he is acquainted with a glory Priya who pleads lift. Here, Gopi’s mind again vacillates and loves her. Forthwith, he dumbs Lakshmi to get married to Priya. Being unbeknownst of her true identity i.e., a die-hard terrorist Monica Bedi, the girlfriend of Abbu Gulam. Priya / Monica Bedi ruses to operate Gopi as a human bomb, therefore, she pretends to obtain his proposal. Monice Bedi/Priya also kicks the asses of Hotel staff because the hotel's owner identified her from the news and wanted to capture her. She beats them bad. She does the same to Gopi's friend's bodyguards. They are extremely muscular but she sweeps the floor with them like they are silly kids. 

Right now, Gopi notifies his intention to parents and falls short of the nuptial. Listening to it, his parents collapse and takes a step to knit Lakshmi with their nephew Vamsi. Meanwhile, Balavinder Cheda apprehends Abbu Gulam through him he detects the whereabouts of Monica. Plus, he intervenes at the right time to rescue Gopi from her clutches. Freed Gopi lands at the venue to marry Lakshmi and is stunned to spot Vamsi as the bridegroom. Once again, he attempts to craft but greets everyone's loathing. At that point, Vamsi implies to him that people with a flighty mindset never prosper. After soul-searching, Gopi seeks an apology, and all promptly forgive him. At last, when Gopi is about to knot with Lakshmi, Goddess Lakshmi appears before him in human form. Finally, the movie ends with a mesmerized Gopi's approach towards Goddess Lakshmi to tie her, when she proves to Lord Vishnu that people this way never change.

Cast 

 Allari Naresh as Gopi
 Jagapati Babu as Balavendra Chadda
 Gowri Munjal as Lakshmi
 Aarti Chhabria as Priya / Monica Judi
 Vadde Naveen as Vamsi
 Suresh as Lord Vishnu
 Rambha as Goddess Lakshmi
 Vinod Kumar as Abbu Gulam
 Brahmanandam as Sampurnam
 Ali as Balaraju
 Sunil as Resort Manager Karunanidhi
 Venu Madhav as Krishunudu
 Tanikella Bharani as Gopi's father
 Mallikarjuna Rao as Malli
 Sai Kiran as Kiran 
 Pradeep as Sudeep 
 Sri Harsha as Harsha 
 Melkote as Boss
 Chittajalu Lakshmipati
 Gundu Hanumantha Rao as Marriage Bureau Owner
 Gundu Sudarshan
 Hema as Gopi's mother
 Geetha Singh as Monalisa
 Kranthi as Lakshmi's sister-in-law

Soundtrack 

Music composed by Koti. The music was released on Supreme Music Company.

References 

2006 films
Indian fantasy comedy films
Films about terrorism in India
2000s Telugu-language films
2000s fantasy comedy films
Films scored by Koti
2006 comedy films